Westdale is a census-designated place (CDP) in Jim Wells County, Texas, United States. The population was 372 at the 2010 census, up from 295 at the 2000 census.

Geography
Westdale is located in northeastern Jim Wells County at  (27.967294, -97.974830).

Demographics
As of the census of 2000, there were 295 people, 92 households, and 80 families residing in the CDP. The population density was 78.0 people per square mile (30.1/km2). There were 106 housing units at an average density of 28.0/sq mi (10.8/km2). The racial makeup of the CDP was 71.86% White, 0.68% African American, 3.73% Native American, 17.63% from other races, and 6.10% from two or more races. Hispanic or Latino of any race were 46.78% of the population.

There were 92 households, out of which 48.9% had children under the age of 18 living with them, 80.4% were married couples living together, 3.3% had a female householder with no husband present, and 12.0% were non-families. 10.9% of all households were made up of individuals, and 4.3% had someone living alone who was 65 years of age or older. The average household size was 3.21 and the average family size was 3.33.

In the CDP, the population was spread out, with 30.8% under the age of 18, 9.8% from 18 to 24, 30.2% from 25 to 44, 24.1% from 45 to 64, and 5.1% who were 65 years of age or older. The median age was 31 years. For every 100 females, there were 110.7 males. For every 100 females age 18 and over, there were 117.0 males.

The median income for a household in the CDP was $39,773, and the median income for a family was $46,094. Males had a median income of $32,188 versus $15,156 for females. The per capita income for the CDP was $15,640. About 19.5% of families and 30.8% of the population were below the poverty line, including 44.9% of those under the age of eighteen and none of those 65 or over.

Education
Westdale is served by the Orange Grove Independent School District.

References

Census-designated places in Jim Wells County, Texas
Census-designated places in Texas